Beji (Berji, Pashi, or Barsaq) is a traditional Kurdish sweet that is mostly prepared in Kermanshah, Ilam, and Kurdistan. Beji is made from a combination of wheat oil and flour. After frying, some sugar or powdered sugar is poured on it and used.

Recipes 
Beji is made from flour, sugar, oil, eggs, milk, cumin, fennel and turmeric. All ingredients are mixed together and fried in oil and garnished with sugar.

Name 
The word beji or berji is derived from the source berjanen, which in southern Kurdish means toast. Beji or burji means roasted. In another narration, beji means (survival) and is a kind of traditional homemade sweet that was used in the past as a travel bag and it means to eat and stay alive.

References 

Iranian cuisine
Fried foods